Crime Scene: The Times Square Killer is a 2021 American limited docu-series made for Netflix and directed by Joe Berlinger. It is the second installment in the Crime Scene documentary series, following Crime Scene: The Vanishing at the Cecil Hotel. Its story focuses on the series of 1970s-1980s murders that were carried out by American serial killer Richard Cottingham, also known as the Times Square Killer and the Torso Killer. The series was released on December 29, 2021.

Episodes

References

External links

2021 American television series debuts
2021 American television series endings
2021 American television seasons
2020s American documentary television series
Documentary television series about crime in the United States
English-language Netflix original programming
Netflix original documentary television series
Television series based on actual events
Television series created by Joe Berlinger
Times Square